Tarana Road railway station is a small railway station in Ujjain district, Madhya Pradesh. Its code is TAN. It serves Tarana town. The station consists of two platforms, neither well sheltered. It lacks many facilities including water and sanitation. This station is electrified in 1992 and Ratlam–Ujjain-Bhopal passenger was first electric train on this track.

Major trains

 Indore–Bhopal Express
 Bina–Ratlam via Nagda Passenger (unreserved)
 Dahod–Bhopal Intercity Express 
 Somnath–Jabalpur Express (via Itarsi)
 Nagda–Bina Passenger (unreserved)
 Narmada Express
 Darbhanga–Ahmedabad Sabarmati Express
 Varanasi–Ahmedabad Sabarmati Express
 Ujjain–Bhopal Passenger

References

Railway stations in Ujjain district
Ratlam railway division